These page shows the results of the II Beach Volleyball World Championships, held from 19 July to 24 July 1999 in Marseille, France. It was the second official edition of this event, after ten unofficial championships (1987-1996) all held in Rio de Janeiro, and the first to be organized in Europe. The event, organized every two years and with $600,000 in total prize money, was held in a special facility for 5,000 spectators. At the end of the competition the spectators totalled nearly 50,000.

Men's competition

Final ranking (top twelve)
 A total number of 87 participating couples

Women's competition
 A total number of 71 participating couples

Final ranking (top twelve)

References
 Beach Volleyball Results

1999
W
B
B